Triarthron is a genus of round fungus beetles in the family Leiodidae. There are at least two described species in Triarthron.

Species
These two species belong to the genus Triarthron:
 Triarthron lecontei Horn, 1868
 Triarthron maerkelii Märkel, 1840

References

Further reading

 
 
 

Leiodidae
Articles created by Qbugbot